Mark Matsumoto is an American engineer specializing in water and wastewater treatment, especially land-based treatment systems and hazardous waste site remediation. He is currently the Dean of the University of California, Merced's School of Engineering and an Elected Fellow of the American Association for the Advancement of Science.

References 

Fellows of the American Association for the Advancement of Science
University of California, Merced faculty
Engineers from California
Living people
University of California, Irvine alumni
University of California, Davis alumni
Year of birth missing (living people)